Debhata is an upazila of Satkhira District in the Division of Khulna, Bangladesh.

Geography 
It has 17724 households and total area 176.33 km2.

Debhata Upazila is bounded by Satkhira Sadar Upazila on the north, Assasuni Upazila and Satkhira Sadar Upazila on the east, Kaliganj Upazila on the south and Hasnabad and Basirhat I CD Blocks in North 24 Parganas district in West Bengal, India on the west.

Demographics 
According to the 2011 Bangladesh census, Debhata had a population of 125,358. Males constituted 49.80% of the population and females 50.20%. Muslims formed 81.19% of the population, Hindus 18.80% and Christians 0.01%. Debhata had a literacy rate of 54.82% for the population 7 years and above.

According to the 1991 Bangladesh census, Debhata had a population of 99068. Males constituted 51.11% of the population, and females 48.89%. The population aged 18 or over was 50,418. Debhata has an average literacy rate of 30.9% (7+ years), compared to the national average of 32.4%.

Administration 
Debhata Upazila is divided into five union parishads: Debhata, Kulia, Noapara, Parulia, and Sakhipur. The union parishads are subdivided into 59 mauzas and 125 villages.

See also 
 Upazilas of Bangladesh
 Districts of Bangladesh
 Divisions of Bangladesh

References 

Upazilas of Satkhira District
Satkhira District
Khulna Division